Wesley 'Wes' Fellowes (born 7 March 1961) is a former Australian rules footballer who played in the Victorian Football League (VFL) and South Australian National Football Leagues (SANFL).

Originally from Bulleen-Templestowe Football Club, Fellowes was a tall ruckman and son of former Collingwood Football Club player Graeme Fellowes. Collingwood recruited Fellowes and he made his senior VFL debut in Round 13 1981. He was quite a skillful and mobile ruckman, but his work rate was always questioned by the football public. He played some consistent football after an improving start to his career, and in 1986 he stunned people, winning Collingwood's Best and Fairest award, the Copeland Trophy. 

Fellowes would fade away late in his 102-game career, finishing at Collingwood in 1989.

Fellowes played for the Port Adelaide Football Club in the SANFL in 1991.

External links

1961 births
Living people
Collingwood Football Club players
Copeland Trophy winners
Australian rules footballers from Victoria (Australia)
Port Adelaide Football Club (SANFL) players
Port Adelaide Football Club players (all competitions)